The 1990 Embassy World Darts Championship was held at the Lakeside Country Club in Frimley Green, Surrey from 5–13 January 1990.  It saw then-unknown Phil Taylor win the first of sixteen world titles, beating his mentor Eric Bristow 6–1 in sets in the final, with Taylor playing in his first ever World Championship at the age of 29.  Taylor beat Russell Stewart, Dennis Hickling, Ronnie Sharp and Cliff Lazarenko en route to the final.  Defending champion Jocky Wilson fell at the quarter-final stage, losing to Mike Gregory.  The event also saw America's Paul Lim hit the first nine-dart finish at the World Championship in his second round match with Ireland's Jack McKenna, receiving £52,000 for his efforts. It was the only nine-dart finish ever thrown in the BDO World Championship.

Seeds
  Eric Bristow
  Bob Anderson
  John Lowe
  Mike Gregory
  Jocky Wilson
  Russell Stewart
  Peter Evison
  Brian Cairns

Prize money
The prize fund was £100,000.

Champion: £24,000
Runner-Up: £12,000
Semi-Finalists (2): £6,000
Quarter-Finalists (4): £3,000
Last 16 (8): £2,200
Last 32 (16): £1,400

There was also a 9 Dart Checkout prize of £52,000, along with a High Checkout prize of £1,000.

The Results

References

BDO World Darts Championships
Bdo World Darts Championship, 1990
BDO World Darts Championships